The 1908 Rhode Island State Rams football team was an American football team that represented Rhode Island State College (later renamed the University of Rhode Island) as an independent during the 1908 college football season. In its eleventh year under head coach Marshall Tyler, the team compiled a 4–2 record.

Schedule

References

Rhode Island State
Rhode Island Rams football seasons
Rhode Island State Rams football